A FIA Group is a category of car allowed to compete in auto racing. The FIA Appendix J to the international motor sports code defines the various Groups.

While a given racing car may fit into a FIA Group, local rules still may either prohibit the car, or allow additional modifications that aren't part of the FIA Group specifications.

See also
Group A
Group B
Group C
Group N
Group R
Group S
Group 1 (racing)
Group 2 (racing)
Group 3 (racing)
Group 4 (racing)
Group 5 (racing)
Group 6 (racing)
Group 7 (racing)

Fédération Internationale de l'Automobile